Stips is a 1951 West German romantic comedy film directed by Carl Froelich and starring Gustav Fröhlich, Heli Finkenzeller and Eva Ingeborg Scholz. It was shot at the Tempelhof Studios in West Berlin. The film's sets were designed by the art director Hans Luigi.

Synopsis
Doctor Dirkhoff, nicknamed Stips, was a popular but unconventional art teacher at a local school. Many of the girls in his classes had romantic crushes on him. WHen he returns to the town nearly a decade, now a widower, most of his former students are now happily married but his return reawakens their old desire for him.

Cast
 Gustav Fröhlich as Dr. Klaus Michael Dirkhoff, genannt Stips
 Heli Finkenzeller as Katja Romberg
 Eva Ingeborg Scholz as Regine Wülfing
 Hans Richter as Albert Pollmann, Friseuer
 Ruth Nimbach as Elli P., geb. Pieper
 Otto Gebühr as Stülpe, Burgkastellan
 Aribert Wäscher as Wilhelm Tobias, Schuldirektor
 Bruno Fritz as Felix Sommer, Verleger
 Ann Höling as Jutta S.
 Renate Barken
 Dagmar Biener
 Christa Fügner
 Sigrid Lagemann
 Eva Probst
 Violet Rensing

References

Bibliography 
 Bock, Hans-Michael & Bergfelder, Tim. The Concise Cinegraph: Encyclopaedia of German Cinema. Berghahn Books, 2009.

External links 
 

1951 films
1951 romantic comedy films
German romantic comedy films
West German films
1950s German-language films
Films directed by Carl Froelich
Films shot at Tempelhof Studios
German black-and-white films
1950s German films